This is a list of active and extinct volcanoes in Russia.

what is the point

Kamchatka
Volcanoes of the  Kamchatka Peninsula of the northwestern Pacific Ocean and the Russian Far East.

Kuril Islands 
Volcanoes of the Kuril Islands, in the northwestern Pacific Ocean between the Kamchatka Peninsula and Japan.

Other parts of Russia

Example

References 

Russia
 
Lists of coordinates
Volcanoes
Volcanoes